Aluminized screen may refer to a type of cathode ray tube (CRT) for video display, or to a type of projection screen for showing motion pictures or slides, especially in polarized 3D.

Some cathode ray tubes, e.g., television picture tubes, include a thin layer of aluminium deposited on the back surface of their internal phosphor screen coating. Light from an excited area of the phosphor which would otherwise wastefully shine back into the tube is instead reflected forward through the phosphor coating, increasing the total visible light output. The aluminium layer must be thick enough to reflect light efficiently, yet not so thick as to absorb too great a proportion of the electron beam that excites the phosphor.

Some projection screens have an aluminized surface, usually an aluminium paint rather than a solid sheet of the metal. They reflect polarized light without altering its polarization. This is necessary when showing 3D films as left-eye and right-eye views which are superimposed but oppositely polarized (typically at opposite 45 degree angles to the vertical if linearly polarized, right-handed and left-handed if circularly polarized). Audience members wear polarized glasses that allow only the correct image to be seen by each eye.

Cathode ray tube